Trott's Pond is a small lake in the northeast of Bermuda. Like many of Bermuda's lakes, it is brackish, as it lies close to the Atlantic Ocean.

The lake lies in Hamilton Parish to the east of Harrington Sound and 800 metres (half a mile) northeast of the larger Mangrove Lake.

Lakes of Bermuda
Hamilton Parish